Submarine Raider is a 1942 American war film directed by Lew Landers and starring John Howard.

Plot

Production
Budd Boetticher was working as an assistant director at Columbia Pictures, notably to George Stevens on The More the Merrier. Harry Cohn took a liking to Boetticher and got him to direct the last two days of filming. Boetticher said it was a 12-day picture and recalled "my God, I studied! I prepared every angle, I went over the script line by line, I prepared for those two days as if I were directing Gone With the Wind, because I didn't have any talent for it."

Boetticher called Landers "a no-talent guy. They called him the "D" director there at Columbia; he just wasn't any good. Whenever they had a picture they didn't really care about, they'd give it to Landers." He later performed a similar task on U-Boat Prisoner (1944).

References

External links
 
 Submarine Raider at TCMDB

1942 films
American war drama films
Columbia Pictures films
American World War II films
World War II films made in wartime
Films directed by Lew Landers
1940s war drama films
1942 drama films
American black-and-white films
Films with screenplays by Aubrey Wisberg
1940s English-language films